Chržín is a municipality and village in Kladno District in the Central Bohemian Region of the Czech Republic. It has about 300 inhabitants.

Administrative parts
Villages of Budihostice and Dolní Kamenice are administrative parts of Chržín.

References

Villages in Kladno District